Genetic redundancy is a term typically used to describe situations where a given biochemical function is redundantly encoded by two or more genes. In these cases, mutations (or defects) in one of these genes will have a smaller effect on the fitness of the organism than expected from the genes’ function. Characteristic examples of genetic redundancy include (Enns, Kanaoka et al. 2005) and (Pearce, Senis et al. 2004). Many more examples are thoroughly discussed in (Kafri, Levy & Pilpel. 2006).

The main source of genetic redundancy is the process of gene duplication which generates multiplicity in gene copy number. A second and less frequent source of genetic redundancy are convergent evolutionary processes leading to genes that are close in function but unrelated in sequence (Galperin, Walker & Koonin 1998). Genetic redundancy is typically associated with signaling networks, in which many proteins act together to accomplish teleological functions. In contrast to expectations, genetic redundancy is not associated with gene duplications [Wagner, 2007], neither do redundant genes mutate faster than essential genes [Hurst 1999]. Therefore, genetic redundancy has classically aroused much debate in the context of evolutionary biology (Nowak et al., 1997; Kafri, Springer & Pilpel . 2009).

From an evolutionary standpoint, genes with overlapping functions implies minimal, if any, selective pressures acting on these genes. One therefore expects that the genes participating in such buffering of mutations will be subject to severe mutational drift diverging their functions and/or expression patterns with considerably high rates. Indeed it has been shown that the functional divergence of paralogous pairs in both yeast and human is an extremely rapid process. Taking these notions into account, the very existence of genetic buffering, and the functional redundancies required for it, presents a paradox in light of the evolutionary concepts. On one hand, for genetic buffering to take place there is a necessity for redundancies of gene function, on the other hand such redundancies are clearly unstable in face of natural selection and are therefore unlikely to be found in evolved genomes.

Duplicated genes that diverge in function may undergo subfunctionalization or can become  degenerate. When two protein coding genes are degenerate there will be conditions where the gene products appear functionally redundant and also conditions where the gene products take on unique functions.

References
 Pearce, A. C., Y. A. Senis, et al. (2004). "Vav1 and vav3 have critical but redundant roles in mediating platelet activation by collagen." J Biol Chem 279(52): 53955-62.
 Enns, L. C., M. M. Kanaoka, et al. (2005). "Two callose synthases, GSL1 and GSL5, play an essential and redundant role in plant and pollen development and in fertility." Plant Mol Biol 58(3): 333-49.
 Kafri, R., M. Levy, et al. (2006). "The regulatory utilization of genetic redundancy through responsive backup circuits." Proc Natl Acad Sci U S A 103(31): 11653-8.
 Galperin, M. Y., Walker, D. R. & Koonin, E. V. (1998) Genome Res 8, 779-90.
 Kafri R, Springer M, Pilpel Y. Genetic redundancy: new tricks for old genes. Cell. 2009 Feb 6;136(3):389-92.
 Wagner A, Wright J. Alternative routes and mutational robustness in complex regulatory networks. Biosystems. 2007 Mar;88(1-2):163-72. Epub 2006 Jun 15.
 Hurst LD, Smith NG. Do essential genes evolve slowly? Curr Biol. 1999 Jul 15;9(14):747-50.

Genetics terms